The Robert E. Horton Medal is given out by the American Geophysical Union to recognize "outstanding contributions to the geophysical aspects of hydrology".  The award was created in 1974 and named after Robert E. Horton to honor his contributions to the study of the hydrologic cycle.  It was awarded biennially until 1995 and then annually thereafter.

Past recipients
Source: American Geophysical Union

See also
 List of geophysicists
 List of geophysics awards
 List of prizes named after people

References

H
Hydrology organizations
Awards established in 1974